Rani Saheba (My Queen) also called Bazarbattu is a 1930 Indian silent film. It is cited as the first children's film made in India. The film was co-directed by V. Shantaram and Keshavrao Dhaiber. The cinematographers were S. Fattelal and Vishnupant Govind Damle and the cast included Keshavrao Dhaiber, Baburao Pendharkar, V. Shantaram and Anant Apte.

Vishnupant Damle, Dhaiber, S. Fattelal and Shantaram had left the Maharashtra Film Company in 1929 to form their own company called Prabhat Film Company. With the success of their first silent film, Gopal Krishna (1929), the company produced five silent films in "quick succession", Khooni Khanjar (1930), Rani Saheba (1930), Udaykal (1930), Chandrasena (1931), and Zulum (1931). Out of these Rani Saheba and Khooni Khanjar are cited as some of the "lighter" films produced by Prabhat Films. Master Anant Apte was "nicknamed" 'Bazarbattu' following the success of his role in the film.

Cast
 Keshavrao Dhaiber
 Baburao Pendharkar
 V. Shantaram
 Anant Apte

References

External links

1930 films
Indian silent films
1930s Hindi-language films
Prabhat Film Company films
Films directed by V. Shantaram
Indian black-and-white films